The BMW R1100RS is a sport-touring motorcycle that was manufactured by BMW Motorrad between 1993 and 2001, and was the first BMW motorcycle to use the R259 "Oilhead" boxer engine.

Design
The engine was named "Oilhead" as it had air-cooled cylinders but oil-cooled heads. 

The BMW R1100RS used a frameless design, using the engine as a stressed member, an approach used by BMW for all subsequent oilheads (except the R1100S). Instead of having conventional telescopic forks, the R1100RS used BMW's own Telelever suspension which bolted directly to the engine. The Telelever design has a superficially similar appearance to telescopic forks, but braking forces are taken back horizontally, minimising "fork dive". A rear subframe supported the rider, passenger and luggage. Both fully faired and half-faired variants were available.

In 1993 the engine was adopted for the R1100GS. In 1999, a more powerful six-speed version of the R259 engine was fitted in the BMW R1100S. In 2013 BMW introduced liquid-cooling for their flat-twin motorcycle engines, but the company still fit oilhead boxer engines to roadsters such as the R nineT and the R1100R.

Awards
The R1100RS was marketed in the United States from 1994, when it was chosen as Cycle World's best standard motorcycle of 1994.

References

External links

R1100RS
Motorcycles powered by flat engines
Shaft drive motorcycles
Motorcycles introduced in 1992